Petro Doroshenko (1627–1698) was a Cossack political and military leader, Hetman of Right-bank Ukraine (1665–1672) and a Russian voyevoda.

Background and early career 

Petro Doroshenko was born in Chyhyryn into a noble Cossack family with a strong tradition of leadership. His father, a Registered Cossack, held the rank of colonel, and his grandfather Mykhailo held the  bulava ( to 1628) as hetman of the Registered Cossack Army.

Though it is not known where Doroshenko studied, there is no doubt that he received an excellent education. Doroshenko became fluent in Latin and Polish and had a broad knowledge of history.     
In 1648 Doroshenko joined the forces of Bohdan Khmelnytsky in the 1648-1657  uprising against the  Polish domination of Ukraine. In the earlier stages of the uprising Doroshenko carried out both military and diplomatic roles. He primarily served in the Chyhyryn regiment, where he held the rank of artillery secretary, eventually being appointed colonel of the Pryluky regiment in 1657.  
When Khmelnytsky died in 1657 Doroshenko supported the election of General Chancellor Ivan Vyhovsky as Khmelnytsky's successor. Between 1657 and 1658 he helped Hetman Vyhovsky (in office: 1657-1659) to suppress the pro-Russian uprising of Iakiv Barabash and Martyn Pushkar, a bloody fratricidal conflict which resulted in some 50,000 deaths.

The  Zaporizhian Hetman Pavlo Teteria (in office: 1663-1665) promoted Doroshenko to the rank of his chief (general) yesaul in 1663. Doroshenko became the leader of the Cossack starshyna (senior officers) and of the elements within the ecclesiastical authorities who opposed the 1654 Pereiaslav Agreement between the Cossacks and the Tsardom of Russia. Supported by Crimean Tatars and by Ottoman Turkey in 1665, Doroshenko crushed the pro-Russian Cossack bands and eventually became Hetman of Ukraine (Right-bank Ukraine) on 10 October 1665.

Hetman

Hetmancy and Treaty of Andrusovo
Poland withdrew from the right-bank Ukraine due to numerous peasant and cossack uprisings, whose rebels sought to secure their liberties with military support from countries other than Poland and Moscow. They found it in the realm of the Ottoman Empire, the Crimean Khanate. In the beginning the first Hetman recognized by Crimea was Sotnyk (captain) Stepan Opara from the Medvedesky company. However, that same summer of 1665 he was replaced by Doroshenko. In order to strengthen his new position, Doroshenko introduced reforms in hope of winning the respect of the rank and file Cossacks. Doroshenko would often organize general councils where he would listen to the lower classes' opinions. And in order to rid himself of the dependence on the starshyna (senior officers), the hetman created the Serdiuk regiments which consisted of 20,000 mercenary infantry units who took orders only from him. When his hetmancy began, Doroshenko, like all Right-bank hetmans, followed a pro-Polish line, but he quickly changed this policy upon hearing the signing of the 1667 Treaty of Andrusovo. The treaty officially divided Ukraine between Russia and Poland, with Russia gaining sovereignty over Left-bank Ukraine and Poland acquiring Right-bank Ukraine. Once the news reached Doroshenko, he reportedly suffered a seizure upon learning of Ukraine's partitioning. Doroshenko quickly deserted his pro-Polish position and decided to seek aid from the Ottoman Empire.

War with Poland and Turkish alliance
In the fall of 1667 Doroshenko, with support of Crimean Tatars, defeated the Polish forces at the Battle of Brailiv (Brailiv) in Podolia. After the battle, Doroshenko's opposition, led by the Kosh Otaman Ivan Sirko and Tatars stopped his further advance against Poles. With the Right-Bank seemingly secured, Doroshenko and his men crossed into Left-bank Ukraine and supported an uprising of Ivan Briukhovetsky against Russia. 

As Doroshenko was reaching his zenith of power after successfully reuniting Ukraine, his numerous enemies united against him. The new Polish offensive forced him to return to the Right-bank Ukraine, appointing Demian Mnohohrishny acting hetman of the Left-bank. Doroshenko managed to secure the release from Polish captivity of the Metropolitan of Kiev, Galicia and all Ruthenia — Yosyf Tukalsky-Neliubovych — who moved his seat to Chyhyryn.

In January 1668 the Council of Officers (Seniors) in Chyhyryn expressed its support for Doroshenko's intentions to ally with the Ottoman Empire. In autumn of 1668 the Cossack delegation was sent to Constantinople with a proposal for military alliance between the Cossack state and the Ottoman Empire. The alliance was approved again at the 1669 Korsun Cossack Council (General Military Council) on 10–12 March. The alliance was eventually proclaimed by sultan Mehmed IV on 1 May 1669, Doroshenko receiving a title of Sanjak-bey.

Separatism of Mnohohrishny, Sukhoviy and Khanenko
At the same time in the fall of 1668 Demian Mnohohrishny pledged his allegiance to Russia and on 13 March 1669 his election was confirmed. Also in the fall of 1668 some Zaporizhian Cossacks who opposed Doroshenko elected new hetman the Zaporizhian Sich chancellor Petro Sukhoviy who also secured support of Crimean Tatars. Sukhoviy challenged Doroshenko, but he was defeated at the battle of Olkhivets by the troops of Petro Doroshenko and Ivan Sirko. In summer of 1669 Sukhoviy along with Tatars attacked Doroshenko, but the Ottomans requested for Crimean Tatars to withdraw their support for Sukhoviy. In June 1669 Sukhoviy was deposed and he supported the election of the Uman Regiment Colonel Mykhailo Khanenko. Eventually Sukhoviy escaped to Crimea after Khanenko was defeated by Doroshenko at the battle of Stebliv on 29 October 1669.

In 1670 in Ostrog through the local commission, Doroshenko unsuccessfully tried to revive the principles 1658 Treaty of Hadiach in negotiations with Poland. Meanwhile, Khanenko's envoys managed to conclude a treaty with the Poles in Ostrog on 2 September 1670. Soon after the Poles recognized his hetmancy, Khanenko and Jan Sobieski launched a massive invasion onto the Right-bank.

War campaign against Poland and Russia

In 1672, with a force of 12,000 he aided the 100,000 strong Ottoman Army which invaded Poland, defeating the Polish army at the battle of Chertvenivka and laid siege to Kamenets (it had been captured and sacked) as well as Lviv. The war ended with the capture of Podolia and the signing of the Peace of Buchach. According to the terms of the treaty, the Podolia voivodeship was turned into an Ottoman province. And the Bratslav Voivodeship and the southern portion of the Kiev Voivodship were to be recognized as Cossack territory administered by Doroshenko under a Turkish protectorate. But the war left consequences for Doroshenko, devastating his country. The vast Ukrainian territory was laid waste, cities were burned down, and hundreds of people were taken into captivity by the Crimean Tatars.

Meanwhile, in summer of 1672, Demian Mnohohrishny was replaced by Ivan Samoylovych at the 1672 Cossack general council near Konotop, Cossack Grove. As the Right-bank faced devastation by the Turkish power, Doroshenko began to lose the respect of his previously loyal civilians because of his collaboration with the "hated infidels." Although the alliance did perform an integral part in his successes, the rest of the population suffered at the hands of the Turks. As his forces were weakened from the ongoing wars, Doroshenko was forced to rely increasingly on the Ottomans. This was very unpopular with the majority of deeply Orthodox Christian Cossacks. As the Turks were considered the hated infidels of Europe. On the 1674 Council of Officers in Pereyaslav (17 March) Samoylovych was proclaimed the Hetman of all Ukraine. However the title was not in force until Doroshenko would abdicate. In the summer of 1674 Samoylovych, along with the Russian Grigory Romodanovsky launched an expedition against Doroshenko and besieged Chyhyryn. At that time Mykhailo Khanenko surrendered his title of hetman to Samoylovych in exchange for some land estates. The Grand Vizier Kara Mustafa managed to lift the siege and drive the Russian forces beyond the Dnieper.

However, already in the fall of 1675 at the Cossack council in Chyhyryn Doroshenko abdicated and pledged his allegiance to Russia, with Ivan Sirko witnessing it. However, the Russian government demanded him to abdicate again, on the territory of Left-bank Ukraine, and it should be witnessed by Samoylovych and Romodanovsky, the request of which Doroshenko refused. In the fall of 1676 Samoylovych crossed the Dnieper with an army of 30,000 men and once again besieged Chyhyryn. After several hours of battle Doroshenko asked his 2,000 Serdiuk garrison to lay down their arms as he had decided to abdicate, which he did on 19 September 1676.

Doroshenko was arrested and brought to Moscow where he was kept in honorary exile, never to return to Ukraine.

Service for Russia

Voivode of Vyatka

In 1676 Petro Doroshenko asked new Russian Tsar Feodor III to forgive him and promised his loyalty. In 1679 he was appointed voyevoda (governor-duke) of Vyatka in central Russia, and after a few years was granted an estate of Yaropolcha in Volokolamsk Uyezd. Petro Doroshenko died in 1698 near Volokolamsk. To this day he remains a controversial figure in Ukrainian history. Some consider him a national hero who wanted an independent Ukraine, while to others he was a power-hungry Cossack Hetman who offered Ukraine to a Muslim Sultan in exchange for hereditary overlordship of his native land.

Descendants
Among his descendants are Natalia Pushkina, Maria Nirod, and Dmytro Doroshenko. Natalia would marry the poet Alexander Pushkin, and have a daughter named also Natalia, who was named the Countess of Merenberg following her marriage to her husband, a Nassau prince. Their descendants subsequently married into, amongst others, the Romanov dynasty and the Westminster and Milford-Haven noble families of Great Britain. Dmytro on the other hand was a prominent Ukrainian political figure during the Russian Revolution and a leading Ukrainian emigre historian during the inter-war period.

In 2013, with the support of the museum “myzei Hetmanstva” the "Hetman Petro Doroshenko fund” was created. The Fund carries out research activity about the Hetmans of Ukraine: Myhailo and Petro Doroshenko, shares the information about them, researches genealogy of Doroshenko.

See also 
Reply of the Zaporozhian Cossacks
Hetmans of Ukrainian Cossacks

References

External links 

Brockhaus-Efron entry on Rulex 
Internet Encyclopedia of Ukraine entry
Song about Hetman of Ukraine Petro Doroshenko
Official site of the museum Getmanstva 

1627 births
1698 deaths
People from Chyhyryn
People from Kiev Voivodeship
Petro
Hetmans of the Zaporozhian Cossacks
Colonels of the Cossack Hetmanate
Obozni General of the Cossack Hetmanate
Zaporozhian Cossack military personnel of the Khmelnytsky Uprising